Norair Martirosovich Sisakian (Sissakian) (12 January 1907 – 12 March 1966) was a Soviet Armenian biochemist, academic, one of the founders of space biology, an outstanding organizer of science, a member of the Pugwash movement.

He was a Member of the Presidium of the Academy of Sciences of the USSR, a member of the Armenian Academy of Sciences, the Vice-President of the International Academy of Astronautics, the Chairman of the Committee on Bioastronautics of the International Astronautics Federation. State Prize of the USSR in 1952. In 1964 he was unanimously elected as a President of the 21st session of the UNESCO General Conference.

Biography 
Sisakian finished the Yerevan State University and then the Moscow Agricultural Academy in 1932. From 1935 he worked in the Moscow Institute of biochemics after A. N. Bach. Professor of the Moscow State University. During his life Sisakian created fourteen laboratories and the Puschin center of the Russian Academy of Sciences.

He is well known for his concept on chloroplasts as poly-functional cell structures. He greatly contributed to the Soviet space program.

A crater on the Far side of the Moon was named in his honor. In 2001 the "Academician Norair Martirosovich Sissakian" book was released by the Russian publishing house "Nauka". A school and a prospect in Yerevan are named after him. A museum of Sisakian was opened in his hometown Ashtarak, Armenia.

In 2007 Sisakian's name was added to the List of notable dates of UNESCO.

His son, Alexei Sisakian (1944–2010), was a well-known physicist, academic of the Russian Academy of Sciences and Armenian Academy of Sciences, the Vice-president of "Dubna" International University, director of the Joint Institute for Nuclear Research in Dubna, Russia.

Books
(in Russian) Norair Martirosovich Sisakian, Moscow, 1967 (Series on Biochemics)

References

External links 
 Sissakian's biography
 

1907 births
1966 deaths
People from Ashtarak
Armenian academics
Armenian biochemists
Armenian chemists
Armenian scientists
Soviet biochemists
Soviet biologists
Soviet chemists
20th-century biologists
20th-century chemists
Yerevan State University alumni
Full Members of the USSR Academy of Sciences
Armenian people from the Russian Empire
Soviet Armenians
Soviet space program personnel
Academic staff of Moscow State University